Alfredo Lorenzo Palacios (August 10, 1880 – April 20, 1965) was an Argentine socialist politician.

Palacios was born in Buenos Aires, and studied law at University of Buenos Aires, after graduation he became a lawyer and taught at the university until becoming a dean.  

In 1902, he was elected to the Buenos Aires' legislature, and in 1904, to the Chamber of Deputies for the 4th Circunscription of Buenos Aires, which corresponded to the barrio of La Boca, thus becoming the first socialist in the Argentine Congress and in the American continent. Palacios helped create many laws including the "Palacios Law" (Ley Palacios) against sexual exploitation, and others regulating child and women labor, working hours and Sunday rest.

Palacios was elected Senator in 1932, serving until the Senate was dissolved in 1943, and in 1955 was appointed ambassador to Uruguay. In 1960, Palacios was elected again as Senator, and as Deputy in 1963.

References

External links

 

1880 births
1965 deaths
People from Buenos Aires
Argentine people of Spanish descent
Socialist Party (Argentina) politicians
Members of the Argentine Chamber of Deputies elected in Buenos Aires
Members of the Argentine Senate for Buenos Aires
Argentine diplomats
Ambassadors of Argentina to Uruguay
People of the Infamous Decade
Burials at La Recoleta Cemetery